The Iranian ambassador in Madrid is the official representative of the Government in Tehran to the Government of Spain. 

The Persian mission in Madrid, was founded in September 1916 by Mirza Esmail Khan Dabirolmolk Farzaneh who until August 1919 was Persian Plenipotentiary Minister.

List of representatives

See also
Spain–Iran relations

References 

 
Spain
Iran